The Haishan Fishing Port is a fish harbor in Xiangshan District, Hsinchu City, Taiwan.

History
In 1988, the Hsinchu City Government built tide breaker to provide a place for fishing boats to park during monsoon periods.

Economy
Fishermen at this harbor make a living from inshore fishing and shallow sea creatures. The harbor is also a center for fish and produce selling, such as dairy products, organic fruits and vegetables.

Ecology
Most of the fish within the harbor area are blackfish, bream, cuttlefish and shark.

Transportation
The harbor is accessible within walking distance west of Xiangshan Station of Taiwan Railways.

See also
 Fisheries Agency

References

Ports and harbors of Hsinchu